= The Ashtray Hearts =

- Origin: Minneapolis, United States
- Genres: Alternative rock
- Years active: 2000–present
- Members: John Jerry; Brad Augustine; Dan Richmond; Aaron Schmidt; Ryan Scheife; Steve Yernberg

The Ashtray Hearts are a U.S. band originally from Minneapolis. The band currently comprises five members, and their music is described as apartment music, a sound that references Americana, folk, and country while embracing the singer-songwriter aesthetic of early 1970s Asylum Records. The band has toured the U.K. and the U.S., sharing the stage with The New Pornographers, Richard Buckner, Okkervil River, Jesse Sykes, Laura Veirs, Kelly Willis and others. Music from the Ashtray Hearts was featured in the independent film, "The Be All and End All" (2011). "The Strangest Light," the band's third LP, was released in January 2013.

== Members ==
Currently there are five members of the band:

- John Jerry (drums)
- Dan Richmond (vocals, guitar)
- Aaron Schmidt (trumpet, piano, vocals)
- Ryan Scheife (bass)
- Steve Yernberg (guitar, piano, banjo, vocals)

Former members include:

- Brad Augustine (piano, accordion)

== Discography ==
The band has released four albums so far:

- Old Numbers (2003)
1. "Amusement Park"
2. "Disaster"
3. "The One You're Closest To"
4. "Still Shaking"
5. "Queen South"
6. "Anyone's Guess"
7. "Bryn Mawr"
8. "Trestle"
9. "Country Bar"
10. "Spain"
11. "Southern Wedding"
12. "Watching Me Try"
- Perfect Halves (2005)
1. "Rules"
2. "On The Wires"
3. "Exits"
4. "English"
5. "Perfect Halves"
6. "New York"
7. "Long Enough"
8. "Valentine"
9. "Where You Sleep"
10. "Flowers"
- The Strangest Light (2013)
1. "Books"
2. "Let it End"
3. "The Strangest Light"
4. "Names"
5. "Dying Light"
6. "This Again"
7. "Sister"
8. "Hollow Heart"
9. "Brother"
10. "Last Request"
11. "Embers"
12. "White Church Hill"
- Gold Century (2023)
1. "Rooms"
2. "Gold Century"
3. "Walking Back"
4. "Reading Aloud"
5. "Take What's Allowed"
6. "Ways To Die"
7. "Porchlight"
8. "My Sad Heart"
9. "Listening Bell"
10. "Provisions"
11. "Easy To Find"
12. "Careful"
